Blepharita leucocyma is a moth of the family Noctuidae. It is found in India.

References

Cuculliinae
Moths of Asia
Moths described in 1907